The following is a timeline of the history of the municipality of 's-Hertogenbosch, Netherlands.

Prior to 19th century

 1185 - City rights granted.
 1268 - Tafel van de Heilige Geest (charity) active (approximate date).
 1399 -  (gate) built.
 1400 - Public clock installed (approximate date).
1463 - Catastrophic fire, likely witnessed by young Hieronymus Bosch.
 1495 - Artist Hieronymus Bosch active (approximate date).
 1530 - St. John's Cathedral ('s-Hertogenbosch) built.
 1533 -  (city hall) remodelled.
 1559 - Roman Catholic Diocese of 's-Hertogenbosch established.
 1601 - November: Siege of 's-Hertogenbosch (1601).
 1620 -  built.
 1629 - April–September: Siege of 's-Hertogenbosch.
 1638 -  installed.
 1645 - Citadel of 's-Hertogenbosch built.
 1749 -  laid out.

19th century
 1815 - City becomes capital of North Brabant province.
 1817 - Design of  adopted.
 1818 -  in business.
 1824 -  in use.
 1829 - Catholic Nord Brabanter newspaper begins publication.
 1836 - Provinciaal Genootschap Kunsten & Wetenschappen (society of arts & sciences) founded.
 1866 - Population: 24,201.
 1868 - 's-Hertogenbosch railway station opens.
 1874 -  dismantled.
 1880 -  headquartered in city.
 1881 - Kruisstraat railway station and Sprokkelbosch railway station open.
 1883
  begins operating.
 Rijksarchief Noord-Brabant building constructed on Waterstraat.
 1884 - Petrus Josephus Johannus Sophia Marie van der Does de Willebois becomes mayor.
 1885 - 700th anniversary of city founding.
 1886 - Telephone begins operating.
 1895 - Wilhelmina of the Netherlands and regent queen Emma visit city.
 1896 -  begins operating.

20th century

 1903 -  installed.
 1905 -  (church) built.
 1917 -  (church) built.
 1919 - Population: 38,067.
 1926 -  opens.
 1934 -  built.
 1938 - Synagogue built on Prins Bernhardstraat.
 1943 - January: Herzogenbusch concentration camp begins operating near city.
 1944 - 27 October: Allied forces take city.
 1954 - International Vocal Competition 's-Hertogenbosch begins.
 1957 -  supermarket in business (approximate date).
 1959 - Brabants Dagblad (newspaper) in publication.
 1971
 Empel en Meerwijk and Engelen become part of 's-Hertogenbosch.
  built.
 1981 - Rosmalen railway station opens.
 1985 - May: Catholic pope visits city.
 1987 - 's-Hertogenbosch Oost railway station opens.
 1996
 June: 1996 Tour de France cycling race starts from 's-Hertogenbosch.
  radio begins broadcasting.
  becomes mayor.
 2000 - Population: 129,034 municipality.

21st century

 2005 -  established.
 2013 - Population: 142,817 municipality.

See also
 's-Hertogenbosch history
 
 
 , 1567-1794
 
 Other names of 's-Hertogenbosch e.g. Bois-le-Duc, Den Bosch
 Timelines of other municipalities in the Netherlands: Amsterdam, Breda, Delft, Eindhoven, Groningen, Haarlem, The Hague, Leiden, Maastricht, Nijmegen, Rotterdam, Utrecht

References

This article incorporates information from the Dutch Wikipedia.

Bibliography
in English
 
 
 
 
 
 
 
 

in Dutch
 
  1776-1778
 
  1863-1866

External links

's-Hertogenbosch
History of North Brabant
Hertogenbosch
Years in the Netherlands